Insect Queen is the name of several fictional characters appearing in American comic books published by DC Comics.

Fictional character biography

Lana Lang

Earth-One
The first Insect Queen was Lana Lang, Superman's romantic interest from his youth in Smallville. In Superboy #124 (October 1965), Lana rescues an insect-like alien trapped under a tree. In gratitude, he gives her a bio-genetic ring that allows her to gain the powers of insects or arachnids (by giving her lower body the form of a particular bug; each form could only be gained once per day, however). She decides to use it to develop the costumed identity of the superheroine Insect Queen. Lana does not pursue the career for long, though she did gain reserve status in the Legion of Super-Heroes.

Earth-Two
The second Insect Queen was also Lana, but the one from the parallel universe of Earth-2. In The Superman Family #213 (1981), she as an adult receives a scarab found by her archeologist father in an Egyptian tomb, not realizing that it was magical. Possessed by it, Lana became a supervillainess called Insect Queen, with the ability to control and enlarge insects. She briefly worked with the Ultra-Humanite, while the latter's mind was housed within a gigantic ant, until she was saved by the Earth-2 Superman and his wife Lois Lane. Later, she became an occasional superhero, aiding Superman on at least one occasion.

In the reality changed by the "Crisis on Infinite Earths", Lana never became either Insect Queen.

New Earth

In the new continuity created by the events chronicled in Infinite Crisis, a new Insect Queen has been introduced. She is an insectoid alien who first appears in Superman #671-673 (2008). In a nod towards the Silver Age continuity this alien Insect Queen has remade herself in the image of Lana Lang.

The Insect Queen comes from the All-Hive, a civilization of giant insects. Because only one Queen can rule the All-Hive, she and her followers are sent to colonize a new world, suspended in an amber-like substance.

Upon contacting Earth, she makes an arrangement with Lex Luthor for assistance in colonizing the planet, including acquiring a body suitable for it. In return for this, she sends some of her people, the Flea Circus, to assist him in collecting Kryptonite. She also begins transforming workers on a LexCorp moonbase into worker insects.

When Insect Queen returns for her part of the bargain, she finds that Lana Lang is now CEO of LexCorp. She kidnaps Lana and takes her to the moonbase, where she metamorphoses into a form resembling Lana, but with insect-like features, including wings, four arms, antennae and chitinous plates.

While trying to rescue Lana, Superman is captured by Insect Queen due to her midges entering his skull and enhancing her psychic abilities. She then uses his genetic template to create "super soldier-ants". Superman is freed by Lana, and traps the Queen in her suspended animation amber before she can use her mind-control powers again.

The Queen makes a return one year later. While attending a student journalism award ceremony with Jimmy Olsen and Cat Grant, Lana suddenly collapses, with blood pouring out her nose. She receives a call from her doctor telling her that he has "bad news" for her. Following another collapse, Lana is taken to hospital and operated on. She apparently dies on the operating table, but her body is later encased in a cocoon by black insect-like creatures, which then starts to crack open. The hospital is soon engulfed by a gigantic cocoon-like structure, and a number of workers as well as the Science Police and the Guardian are taken hostage by an army of giant insects. Supergirl is soon captured and awakens bound and gagged at the feet of Lana, who is now possessed by the Insect Queen. The Queen reveals to Supergirl that during her last encounter with Lana, she injected her with a portion of her DNA and has been slowly taking control of her body for the past year, with the ultimate goal of capturing a Kryptonian to use as a template for an army of hybrid insects. Supergirl breaks free and is able to expel the Queen from Lana's body with help from Kryptonian technology, and Lana returns to her normal state.

Lonna Leing

The fourth Insect Queen is Lonna Leing of the planet Xanthu, in the 30th century. Lonna was a member of the Xanthuan hero team, the Uncanny Amazers. She first appeared in Legion of Super-Heroes (vol. 4) #82. Her costume is similar to the original Insect Queen, and she even has similar powers, as she is able transform her body from the waist down into an insect or arachnid's body (like an arthropodic centaur) and assume their abilities. Once she parodied Marvel Comics' Spider-Man, when she assumed the powers of a spider and fired webbing from her wrists (using his trademark hand gestures) to wrap an alien attacker. This version of the Legion was identified in the Infinite Crisis miniseries as originating on Earth-247.

Anti-Matter Insect Queen
The fifth Insect Queen is a former member of the Justice Underground, a team of heroes who oppose the Crime Syndicate of America in DC's Anti-Matter Universe. As the Justice Underground comprises "good twins" to Justice League villains, this Insect Queen is the counterpart of the Queen Bee.

Powers and abilities
Each of the versions of Insect Queen can control insects and arachnids.

References

External links
Supermanica: Insect Queen

Characters created by George Papp
Characters created by Kurt Busiek
Characters created by Otto Binder
Comics characters introduced in 1965
Comics characters introduced in 2008
DC Comics aliens
DC Comics metahumans
DC Comics characters who are shapeshifters
DC Comics extraterrestrial superheroes
DC Comics female superheroes